Lufengia is an extinct genus of tritylodonts from the Sinemurian (Early Jurassic) of Yunnan, China. It may be a senior synonym to the related genus Dianzhongia, found nearby.

References

Jurassic synapsids
Prehistoric cynodont genera
Fossils of China
Fossil taxa described in 1959
Tritylodontids